The men's 1000 metres race of the 2015–16 ISU Speed Skating World Cup 2, arranged in the Utah Olympic Oval, in Salt Lake City, United States, was held on November 21, 2015.

Pavel Kulizhnikov of Russia won the race, while Kjeld Nuis of the Netherlands came second, and Gerben Jorritsma of the Netherlands came third. Denis Yuskov of Russia won the Division B race.

Results
The race took place on Saturday, November 21, with Division B scheduled in the morning session, at 09:26, and Division A scheduled in the afternoon session, at 15:31.

Division A

Note: NR = national record.

Division B

Note: NR = national record.

References

Men 01000
2